Georges Conraux (20 July 1885 – 14 May 1957) was a French fencer. He competed in the individual and team sabre competition at the 1924 Summer Olympics.

References

External links
 

1885 births
1957 deaths
French male sabre fencers
Olympic fencers of France
Fencers at the 1924 Summer Olympics